The 1946 Chicago Rockets season was the inaugural season for both the Chicago Rockets and the All-America Football Conference (AAFC) in which they played. The Rockets compiled a 5-6-3 record, were outscored by a total of 315 to 263, and finished in last place in the AAFC's West Division. 

Dick Hanley, who had been the head coach at Northwestern from 1927 to 1934, was the head coach at the start of the season. After the first three games, the players voted 32-to-1 to remove Hanley.  The team felt that Hanley's double-wing system was outdated. After a two-hour meeting between the players and team owner John L. Keeshin, Keeshin fired Hanley. Three of the players (Ned Mathews, Bob Dove, and Willie Wilkin) took over as player-coaches. The "self-coached experiment" ended on October 29 when Pat Boland was hired as head coach. 

The team's statistical leaders included quarterback Bob Hoernschemeyer with 1,266 passing yards and 375 rushing yards, halfback Elroy Hirsch with 347 receiving yards, and backup quarterback (and placekicker) Steve Nemeth with 59 points scored (32 extra points, 9 field goals). Hoernschemeyer was the only Chicago player named to the All-AAFC team, receiving second-team honors from both the United Press and on the official All-AAFC team.

Season schedule

Division standings

Roster
Players shown in bold started at least one game at the position listed as confirmed by contemporary game coverage.

References

Chicago Rockets seasons
Chicago Rockets
Chicago Rockets